Richard Thomas Carroll (July 21, 1884 – November 22, 1945), nicknamed "Shawdow", was a Major League Baseball pitcher. In 2 career games, he had a 0–0 record with a 3.60 ERA. He batted and threw right-handed.

Carroll was born and died in Cleveland, Ohio.

External links
Baseball Reference.com page

1884 births
1945 deaths
Akron Champs players
Baseball players from Cleveland
Canton Chinamen players
Canton Watchmakers players
Jersey City Skeeters players
Major League Baseball pitchers
Montreal Royals players
New Castle Outlaws players
New York Highlanders players
Toronto Maple Leafs (International League) players